Maku is a city in the Central District of Maku County, West Azerbaijan province, Iran, and serves as capital of the county. As of 2016, its population consisted of 46,581 people in 13,940 households. 

The Zangmar River cuts through the city. The Maku Free Trade and Industrial Zone, which opened in 2011, is Iran's largest and the world's second largest free trade zone, encompassing an area of 5,000 square kilometres.

History 
Maku was a region of the old Armenia c. 300–800, previously known as Artaz according to Aziz Atiya's History of Eastern Christianity.

The Castle of Maku, original Shavarshan, was the center of the domains of the princely Armenian family of Amatuni. The Artazian branch of Amatuni family was ruling the Maku region of Artaz still in the XVth century and successfully defended it against Timurleng, when he besieged the castle of Maku. Maku was the capital of a Kangarli Khanate, one of numerous small, semi-independent Maku Khanates that emerged from the breakup of the Safavid Empire in the 18th century.

Maku served as the capital of the Kurdish Jalali dynasty into the 1860s when the centralizing Qajar government in Persia/Iran removed them, appointing a governor instead.

The city is well known in the history of the Baháʼí Faith for its fort where the Báb had been exiled to and imprisoned for nine months. At this fortress Mullá Husayn, the first Disciple of the Báb, arrived on Náw-Rúz of the year 1848 to see the Báb.

Demographics 
According to the 2006 census, its population was 41,865 in 10,428 households. The following census in 2011 counted 42,751 people in 11,761 households. The latest census in 2016 showed a population of 46,581 people in 13,940 households. Azeris make up the majority while Kurds form a minority of the city's population.

Climate 
Maku has a semi-arid climate (Köppen BSk) owing to its location in the rain shadow of the Zagros Mountains. The city is hot and dry in the summer, and cold with little snow in the winter. Most precipitation comes from spring thunderstorms.

Tourism 
Baqcheh Jooq Palace: dates back to the end of the Qajar period. It used to be the house of the local governor until 1974. It is 7 km northwest of central Maku and presently functions as a museum displaying some carpets and local handicrafts.
Farhad's Home: A place near Baqcheh Jooq Palace. A small home with a hall and two rooms that carved into the rock. The saying comes form the story Farhad and Shirin.
Ruins of a fortress are folded into a ledge of the high cliff that towers above the town centre.
Hiking: it is advisable to have a guide or stay within eyesight of the town. Due to its proximity to the Turkish border, it is easy to cross the border unintentionally.
Rock climbing: There are numerous rock climbing sites at the northern part of the city, some exceeding 200 meters.
Panj Cheshmeh – This bridge is located 5 km. from Maku on the Zangmar River, and is a monument from the Safavid era. This bridge was constructed in order to facilitate communications between Tabriz and Maku, and the surrounding rural areas.

Visa-free 
Holders of normal passports travelling as tourists can enter Maku, Iran without a visa with maximum stay of 2 weeks (extendable) as of September 2017.

Admission refused 
Admission is refused to holders of passports or travel documents containing an Israeli visa or stamp or any data showing that visitor has been to Israel or indication of any connection with the state of Israel during the last 12 months.

References 

 Maku on panoramio
P. Oberling, The Turkic Peoples of Iranian Azerbaijan, 1964a, American Council of Learned Scientists

External links 
 Maku pictures
 Iran Free Zones official website
 Maku Free Zone Organization official website
 Mahrāveh Soroushiān, Maku, a Passageway to Cultures (Maku, Gozar'gāh-e Farhang'hā), in Persian, Jadid Online, 9 February 2009, .An audio slideshow,  (5 min 23 sec).

Maku County
Foreign trade of Iran
Special economic zones
Populated places in West Azerbaijan Province
Populated places in Maku County
Cities in West Azerbaijan Province
Kurdish settlements in West Azerbaijan Province